CAH can stand for: 

 Congenital adrenal hyperplasia
 Calcium Aluminate Hydrate, an important phase in cement chemistry
Cardinal Health (NYSE:CAH)
 Chlorinated Aromatic Hydrocarbon
 Community of All Hallows, an Anglican religious community for women
 Crime against humanity
 Cards Against Humanity, a party game
 Critical Access Hospital (CAH); these must have no more than 25 beds, not counting 10 extra psychiatric beds and 10 extra inpatient rehab beds, and must be located in a rural area or an area treated as rural, be certified by the state as being a necessary provider of healthcare services to area residents, and be more than a 35-mile drive away from a hospital or other healthcare facility
 Capital Airport Holding, airport holdings company in the People's Republic of China
 Charlan Air Charter, a South African airline with the ICAO airline designator CAH
 Cambridge Ancient History, a bibliographic abbreviation for the work edited by Cambridge University Press
 Calvin and Hobbes, a newspaper comic strip from 1985 to 1995
Controlled-access highway
 Cyanide and Happiness, a daily webcomic
 CAH, a mnemonic used to teach trigonometry, showing that cosine is the ratio of adjacent over hypotenuse
 CAH, the IATA airport code for Cà Mau Airport